Penguin Dreams and Stranger Things is the third collection of the comic strip series Bloom County by Berkeley Breathed.  It was published in 1985.

It is preceded by Toons For Our Times and followed by Bloom County Babylon.  The book's cover is a parody of Daybreak, a popular painting by Maxfield Parrish.

Synopses of major story lines

 "Motherquest".  Opus sets out for Antarctica to find his mother.  Mistaking it for a luxury cruise liner, Opus boards the Greenpeace Rainbow Warrior, headed for a confrontation with Soviet whaling ships.  After a few harpoonings,  Opus and Mrs. Limekiller land in Antarctica just ahead of an American invasion force, "Operation Antarctic Fury", who have mistaken the penguins for Bulgarian-backed Marxist guerrillas.  The pair is involuntarily "rescued" by the Marines and returned to American soil.  (p11, 25 strips)
 "Survivalism".  Steve Dallas, Portnoy, and Hodge-Podge move into their custom-built bomb shelter, in anticipation of the Soviets dropping "The Big One".  (p20, 6 strips)
 Binkley experiments with break-dancing and dressing like Boy George.  (p23, 3 strips)
 Binkley's father experiences a stressful withdrawal when Binkley hides his cigarettes.  (p26, 5 strips)
 Opus leads new readers on a tour of the comic strip.  (p28, 6 strips)
 Portnoy and Hodge-Podge hunt "wild hunters".  (p30, 4 strips)
 Opus enters Steve Dallas in a drawing to star in a Tess Turbo music video.  Steve unwillingly dons a spiked leather costume (shocking his mother), and submits to the director's outlandish script until pyrotechnics ignite his chest hair.  After a stay in the hospital, Steve sues Tess Turbo in the People's Court, coercing Opus into perjuring on his behalf.  (p32, 20 strips)
 Steve Dallas's disapproving mother stops by for a visit.  (p49, 5 strips)
 The Meadow Party caucus reconvenes.  Hodge-Podge leads an institutional prayer biased toward the long-eared, prompting Portnoy's short-eared ire.  Bill the Cat wins the vote for presidential candidate, despite being dead.  (p51, 12 strips)
 "Time" magazine declares the end of the Sexual Revolution, thereby ending Steve Dallas's conquests at "Bob's Bar and Flesh Market".  (p57, 4 strips)
 Oliver's father gives him a chemistry set.  After a few explosions, Oliver attempts to genetically engineer a long-tailed hamster.  (p59, 6 strips)
 Steve serves as legal counsel to axe-toting "Mrs. Whacker", accused of turning her husband Charlie into chopped liver.  The judge releases Mrs. Whacker without bail, under the condition that she stay at Steve's house.  Mrs. Whacker is found not guilty, precluding Steve from selling her movie rights.  (p62, 19 strips)
 A year after his divorce, Binkley's father seeks his son's permission to start dating.  He brings home the fishnet-clad "Stormee", whom he met in K-mart's hardware department.  (p69, 5 strips)
 Oliver's mother, convinced that he needs a positive role model, wallpapers Oliver's laboratory with a Michael Jackson poster.  (p70, 3 strips)
 Convention time for the Meadow Party.  The delegates pile into Cutter John's "meadow-mobile" and head off to San Francisco.  Bob Woodward obtains dirt on Bill the Cat through ever-innocent Opus.  An enthusiastic armadillo represents the party's Texas delegation.  At the close of the convention, the presumed-dead Bill the Cat makes a surprise entrance.  (p71, 24 strips)
 Oliver hacks into the NBC News computer with the password "Dan Rather is a turnip", and changes the results of the news poll to "Basset hounds got long ears" and "Hold the pickles".  (p80, 4 strips)
 The Jacksons tour Bloom County, and Opus is sent to ask Michael Jackson for a political endorsement.  After visiting Jackson's Disneyland-like "magic kingdom", Opus convinces Jackson to escape his fantasy-land for an afternoon, and teaches him baseball.  Jackson, in turn, has Opus switch places with him, a-la "Prince and the Pauper".  (p91, 17 strips)
 Steve Dallas enters the "Mister America" pageant, and ends up winning, thanks to a hack from Oliver.  A scandal erupts when a number of magazines publish old nude photos of him, including National Geographic and Dog World.  (p98, 12 strips)
 For his dad's birthday, Oliver erases his dad's record from the IRS computer.  Unfortunately, this causes his dad to no longer exist.  Oliver restores the IRS record.  (p103, 4 strips)
 Binkley's mortality visits his anxiety closet.  (p105, 3 strips)
 To boost the Meadow Party's dismal poll results, Opus is sent to hold a rally on a college campus.  He is caught in a riot of right-wing business students who sing folk songs about Reagan and shout, "Don't trust anyone under $30,000 a year."  (p107, 9 strips)
 Run-up to election day.  Despite last-minute speech coaching (Bill's position on tax indexing is "Ackphft") and canvasing (with Opus mistakenly costumed as a chocolate éclair), the Meadow Party fails to take the presidency. (p110, 14 strips)
 Bill the Cat runs off to join the Rajneeshee cult, renaming himself "Bhagwan Bill".  Milo and Opus infiltrate the cult and bring Bill home.  After an unsuccessful attempt to "de-program" Bill, Milo ships the cat off to the Betty Ford Center.  (p115, 16 strips)

Bloom County
Books by Berkeley Breathed
Little, Brown and Company books
1985 books